Pieter Rosalia Van Den Bosch (31 October 1927 – 31 January 2009) was a Belgian international footballer. He participated at the 1954 FIFA World Cup, alongside brother Hippolyte.

References

1927 births
2009 deaths
Belgian footballers
Belgium international footballers
1954 FIFA World Cup players
K. Rupel Boom F.C. players
R.S.C. Anderlecht players
R.A.E.C. Mons players
Belgian football managers
R.A.E.C. Mons managers
K.S.K. Heist players
Association football midfielders
People from Boom, Belgium
Footballers from Antwerp Province